Arya: A Philosophical Review was a 64-page monthly periodical written by Sri Aurobindo and published in India between 1914 and 1921. The majority of the material which initially appeared in the Arya was later edited and published in book-form as The Life Divine, The Synthesis of Yoga, The Secret of the Veda, The Foundations of Indian Culture and The Ideal of Human Unity as well as a number of translations of Vedic literature.

Conception
The Arya was conceived as a joint venture of Sri Aurobindo and Paul Richard, a French national residing at Pondicherry, in the spring of 1914. Sri Aurobindo remarked on more than one occasion that, though he was not averse to the idea, it was Richard who initially proposed the project of publishing a journal. In a letter to Dilip Kumar Roy dated 4 September 1934, he wrote:

It was clear to Sri Aurobindo that the proposed journal would represent a medium through which he could give voice to his still-emerging philosophy – both in India and abroad. In a letter to Motilal Roy from June 1914, he wrote:

Title
Although it is unknown who was responsible for the choice of Arya as the title of the journal, Sri Aurobindo explained what he understood the term to represent. In the second issue (September 1914), he composed an article entitled Arya: Its Significance in which he set forth the meaning of the term as he intended it. He wrote:

Program and organization
The Arya was advertised as "a review of pure philosophy" with a twofold object:

 A systematic study of the highest problems of existence.
 The formation of a synthesis of knowledge, harmonizing the diverse religious traditions of humanity, occidental as well as oriental.

The method of the review was described as one of "realism, at once rational and transcendental; a realism consisting in the unification of intellectual and scientific discipline with those of intuitive experimentation."

The material appearing in the Arya was organized under four main headings:

 Synthetic studies in speculative philosophy.
 Translations and commentaries of ancient texts.
 Studies in comparative Religion.
 Practical methods of inner culture and self-development.

Early difficulties
Although Sri Aurobindo and Richard had planned to share the work of writing and editing the material which was to appear in the journal, Richard was ordered by the French Government to leave Pondicherry and return to France in the middle of 1915. As a result, the French edition of the journal (Revue de Grande Synthèse) was discontinued after only seven issues. Subscriptions for Arya had been sold prior to publication, and Sri Aurobindo was left with the task of completing the outstanding issues. As he remarked in 1934:

Excepting the three contributions made by Richard to the journal (The Wherefore of the Worlds, The Eternal Wisdom and the short Sons of Heaven; see below), the bulk of the remainder was composed by Sri Aurobindo himself.

Discontinuation
In 1921, after six and a half years of uninterrupted publication, Sri Aurobindo discontinued the Arya. In a private discussion in 1926, he gave his reasons for this decision:

Subsequent reprinting and distribution
Although Sri Aurobindo had discontinued its publication, there was an increasing demand for back issues of the Arya after 1921. This led him to have the Arya reprinted in seven volumes, preserving the order in which the articles had originally appeared. The contents of these seven volumes are as follows:
 Volume I (August 1914 - July 1915): The Life Divine, Chapter I - XII · The Wherefore of the Worlds, Chapter I - XI (Paul Richard) · The Secret of the Veda, Chapter I - XI · Isha Upanishad · Kena Upanishad · Synthesis of Yoga, Introduction, Chapter I - VIII · The Eternal Wisdom (Paul Richard) · Soul of a Plant (author unknown) · Question of the Month · The News of the Month · All-Will and Free-Will · Aphorisms · The Type of the Superman · Review: Hymns to the Goddess (translated from the Sanskrit by Arthur and Ellen Avalon) · The Doctrine of Taoism (author unknown) · Nammalwar (with Subramanya Bharathi).
 Volume II (August 1915 - July 1916): Our Ideal · The Life Divine, Chapter XIII - XXIV · The Secret of the Veda, Chapter XII - XX · Kena Upanishad · The Synthesis of Yoga, Chapter IX - XX · The Eternal Wisdom (Paul Richard) · The Hymns of the Atris · The Delight of Works · Evolution · A Vedic Hymn · The Inconscient · Translations: Love-Mad; Refuge (both with Subramanya Bharathi) · The Ideal of Human Unity · Reviews: South Indian Bronzes; Sanskrit Research · Rebirth · A Hymn of the Thought-Gods · Passing of War? · Conservation and Progress · Thoughts and Glimpses · On Ideals · The Conservative Mind and Eastern Progress · Yoga and Skill in Works.
 Volume III (August 1916 - July 1917): The Life Divine, Chapter XXV- XXXV · The Synthesis of Yoga, Chapter XXI - XXXII · The Psychology of Social Development · The Eternal Wisdom (Paul Richard) · Essays on the Gita · The Hymns of the Atris · The Ideal of Human Unity · The God of the Mystic Wine · Heraclitus · Review: God, the Invisible King.
 Volume IV (August 1917 - July 1918): The Life Divine, Chapter XXXVI - XLVI · Essays on the Gita · The Synthesis of Yoga, Chapter XXXIII- XLIV · The Eternal Wisdom (Paul Richard) · The Psychology of Social Development · The Hymns of the Atris · The Ideal of Human Unity · Thoughts and Glimpses · The Vedic Fire · Review: About Astrology · The Future Poetry · Translation: Sentences from Bhartrihari · The Arya's Fourth Year.
 Volume V (August 1918 - July 1919): The Life Divine, Chapter XLVII - LIII · Essays on the Gita · The Synthesis of Yoga, Chapter XLV- LVI · The Renaissance in India · The Future Poetry · The Self-Determination · Materialism · Review: The Feast of Youth · The Knowledge of Brahman · Translation: Sentences from Bhartrihari · Unseen Power · Is India Civilised? · A Rationalistic Critic on Indian Culture · Indian Culture and External Influence · Rebirth, Evolution, Heredity · Rebirth and Soul Evolution · The Significance of Rebirth · The Ascending Unity · Involution and Evolution · 1919.
 Volume VI (August 1919 - July 1920): Essays on the Gita · The Synthesis of Yoga, Chapter LVII LXVIII · A Defence of Indian Culture · The Future Poetry · The Eternal Wisdom (Paul Richard) · Karma · Karma and Freedom · Karma, Will and Consequence · Rebirth and Karma · Karma and Justice · A Vedic Hymn to the Fire · Parasara's Hymns to the Lord of the Flame · Review: Rupam.
 Volume VII (August 1920 - Jan. 1921): The Synthesis of Yoga, Chapter LXIX - LXXIII · The Eternal Wisdom (Paul Richard) · Parasara's Hymns to the Lord of the Flame · After the War · A Defence of Indian Culture · The Lines of Karma · Review: Shama'a · Sons of Heaven (Paul Richard) · Mundaka Upanishad · A Preface on National Education · The Higher Lines of Karma · Supplement.

See also
 Collected Works of Sri Aurobindo

References

Bibliography
 
 
 
 
 

Works by Sri Aurobindo
Religious magazines
Magazines established in 1914
Magazines disestablished in 1921
Monthly magazines published in India
Defunct magazines published in India
Philosophy magazines
Magazines about spirituality